Korean automobile industry can refer to any of the following:

 Automotive industry in South Korea
 Automotive industry in North Korea